The Four Freedoms Award is an annual award presented to "those men and women whose achievements have demonstrated a commitment to those principles which US President Franklin Delano Roosevelt proclaimed in his Four Freedoms speech to the United States Congress on January 6, 1941, as essential to democracy: "freedom of speech and expression, freedom of worship, freedom from want, freedom from fear". The annual award is handed out in alternate years in New York City by the Roosevelt Institute to Americans and in Middelburg, Netherlands, by the Roosevelt Stichting to non-Americans.

History

The awards were first presented in 1982 on the centennial of President Roosevelt's birth as well as the bicentennial of diplomatic relations between the United States and the Netherlands. The awards were founded to celebrate the Four Freedoms espoused by President Roosevelt in his speech:
Freedom of speech
Freedom of worship
Freedom from want
Freedom from fear

For each of the four freedoms an award was instituted, as well as a special Freedom medal. In 1990, 1995, 2003 and 2004 there were also special awards.

In odd years the awards are presented to American citizens or institutions by the Franklin and Eleanor Roosevelt Institute in New York City, though in the past the American awards were given in Hyde Park, New York. In even years the award ceremony is held in Middelburg and honors non-Americans. The choice of Middelburg was motivated by the suspected descendance of the family Roosevelt from Oud-Vossemeer in the municipality Tholen.

Laureates

Freedom Medal

Freedom of Speech

Freedom of Worship

Freedom from Want

Freedom from Fear

Special presentations

See also

 Four Freedoms Monument
 William O. Douglas Prize
 List of religion-related awards

References
Roosevelt Institute, List of laureates
NOS (2008) TV documentary on the Four Freedoms Award
Oosthoek, A.L. (2010) Roosevelt in Middelburg: the four freedoms awards 1982-2008, 
American Rhetoric, Four Freedoms Speech of Roosevelt

External links

Four Freedoms Monument
Roosevelt Institute website

Free expression awards
Human rights awards
Humanitarian and service awards
Religion-related awards
Awards established in 1982
Monuments and memorials to Franklin D. Roosevelt in the United States
Four Freedoms
Middelburg, Zeeland